Malamukalile Daivam (The God Atop the Hill) is a 1983 Malayalam film directed by P. N. Menon. The film is set in a tribal village in Kerala where religious superstition and ignorance maintain stasis. A relatively intelligent boy escapes its oppressive confines and later returns, determined to bring enlightenment to the village. Gabril, Suresh, Sudharani, Kunjandi, Bala Singh, Lakshmi Subramanian, Unni Mary,  Sathindran and Ranjith Kumar form the cast. Several critics consider the film as the most outstanding piece in Menon's filmography. The film won the National Film Awards for Best Regional Film and Best Child Artist (Suresh).

Plot
In a village at the foot of the Banasuran mountains of Wayanad, in Kerala, lives Kayama, a little orphan boy who has been adopted by a villager, Nambi and his daughter, Marie. The tribals who see the sun rise and set every day over these mountains believe that the mountains are the abode of their god. The villagers never go beyond the mountains. Enclosed in their shell of superstition and ignorance, they are quite sure that the mountains are the confines of their world, and no one who tries to cross them will ever come back.

Kayama has always known that he can meet his dead parents on top of the mountains. But who will show him the way? Nambi and Marie do not encourage him at all. Kayama goes to Nenchan, the village drop-out, who spends his days under a tree, smoking a local leaf and indulging in pipe dreams. Nenchan has been a friend and confidant of the little boy for a long time. He is also in love with Marie whom he dares not approach. Nenchan, who is a dreamer himself, understands the child's obsessive desire to climb the forbidden mountains. He agrees to take him. But the fear of Marie's wrath and of violating an age-old belief, stops Nenchan from taking the boy up the mountains. Acutely disappointed, Kayama goes to plead with his sister to find someone to take him on his adventure. Nambi learns of Kayama's mad desire. He tries to dissuade the child by punishing him. Nambiar, the landlord, casually promises Kayama one day that he will take him to the mountains. Kayama persuades Marie to go to Nambiar to remind him of his promise.

Unable to dissuade Kayama, Marie comes to see the landlord. Bored and isolated in his opulent home, Nambiar calls Marie in and seduces her. Waiting outside, Kayama does not understand the significance of Marie's tears. He only knows that his hopes have been dashed again. But he does realize that Nambiar has hurt his sister, and finding him dallying with another girl from the village one day, he throws mud on Nambiar's jeep.

Kayama now decides to take matters in his own hands. He leaves his home in secret and walks away into the unknown. The mountains beckon him. But they are a long way off, and before he can get near them, he meets a lorry driver and his boss who give him a lift, telling him that they are on their way to the mountains. The truth, however, is that the men think that the plucky little boy will make a good servant and look after their cattle. But Kayama is too smart for them. When they stop at a wayside stall to have a cup of tea, Kayama quietly vanishes from the lorry and waits in hiding until the men give up the search and leave.

The lorry has brought Kayama to a little town away from the mountains, where Madhavan Master, a large-hearted old soul, picks him up and decides to make a man out of him. Kayama becomes Ramachandran, and a new world opens out before him. The village with its wide open space, its forests and ponds, its daily hardships and the magic lure of the mountains, is left behind. Ramachandran is given an urban education and becomes an officer, with a large number of employees working under him.

One day, the nostalgia returns. The urge to be with his own people can no longer be denied and Ramachandran leaves for the forgotten village. So many years have passed but the village has retained its old identity. Hidden behind the Banasuran mountains, the tribals still lead a primitive existence. The god of the mountains still holds his sway, and the landlord wields his power with the same ruthlessness as before. Ignorance, superstition and blind faith in an unknown god have imprisoned the minds of the tribals. Marie is an outcast in the village for being the mother of an illegitimate child. Marie has named her child Kayama in memory of her adopted brother. She does not recognize her adopted brother until he calls to her in the language of his childhood.

Coming back to the village has been a revelation for Ramachandran. He realizes that the now has a new mountain to climb. It is only by moving beyond the shadows of the mountains that the villagers can find a new existence. Ramachandran takes it upon himself to change his village. He wins the confidence of the villagers by confronting the landlord on their behalf. He convinces them of the need to break the shackles of ignorance. In a symbolic act of liberty, he gathers the people of his village and takes them up the forbidden mountains. The flames of their torches will light their way to a new awareness that will break through their isolation and find them a place in the sun in the larger world outside.

Cast
Archana as Marie
 Gabril as Ramachandran
 Master Suresh as Kayama, younger Ramachandran
 Sudharani as Sujatha
 Kunjandi as Nambi
 Bala Singh as the landlord
 Sathindran as Nenchan
 Ranjith Kumar as Kayama, Marie's son
 Lakshmi Subramanian
 PR Menon as Madhavan Master
 Rani Abraham

External links
 Malamukalile Daivam at the British Film Institute Movie Database
 
 Malamukalile Daivam at the Malayalam Movie Database

Further reading
 
 From realistic cinema to the mythological (Interview with P. N. Menon). The Hindu. 22 November 1999.

1980s Malayalam-language films
Best Malayalam Feature Film National Film Award winners
Films directed by P. N. Menon (director)